Nasir El Kasmi (born 2 October 1982) is a retired German-Moroccan footballer who played as a midfielder. He made two appearances for the Morocco national team.

Career
El Kasmi was born in Wuppertal, Germany. He spent two seasons in the Bundesliga with Bayer 04 Leverkusen and MSV Duisburg he only played in league games for Duisburg, however, playing in one DFB-Ligapokal game for Bayer). He also holds German citizenship.

References

External links
 
 

Living people
1982 births
Association football midfielders
Moroccan footballers
Morocco international footballers
Bayer 04 Leverkusen players
Bayer 04 Leverkusen II players
MSV Duisburg players
Holstein Kiel players
Bundesliga players
2. Bundesliga players
German people of Moroccan descent